Eudonia bidentata is a moth in the family Crambidae. It was described by Koen V. N. Maes in 2004. It is found in Kenya, South Africa and Zimbabwe.

References

Moths described in 2004
Eudonia